The Vanceboro–St. Croix Border Crossing connects the towns of Vanceboro, Maine and Saint Croix, New Brunswick on the Canada–United States border.  The Canadian government has at times called this crossing McAdam, named for the larger municipality east of St. Croix.  In the early 1900s, this crossing was located at the adjacent lock structure a short distance to the north. At some point in the distant past (at least prior to 1930), a bridge existed to the south of the railroad bridge, extending from Public Crossing Road on the Canadian side.  Concrete footings for this bridge remain on the US side at this site.

A few hundred yards south of this crossing is also an international rail bridge which is notable for the 1915 Vanceboro international bridge bombing incident where a German spy attempted to destroy the bridge.

The Route was the Fastest until 1956 Bangor, Maine to Fredericton, New Brunswick until Interstate 95 open when the Houlton way became the fastest way and formerly Travel thru New Brunswick's Second  Highway 5, now New Brunswick Highway 95. The way went from Highway 2 to Highway 3 to Highway 4 to Maine Route 6 to US Route 2 thru the village of Mcadam, New Brunswick and Lincoln, Maine.

The way was a one lane bridge

See also
 List of Canada–United States border crossings

References

Canada–United States border crossings
1900 establishments in Maine
1900 establishments in New Brunswick
Buildings and structures in Washington County, Maine